Amakusa 1637 may refer to:

 Amakusa 1637, manga written by Michiyo Akaishi
 Shimabara Rebellion, led by Amakusa Shirō, began in 1637

See also
Amakusa (disambiguation)